Le Serpentin Vert (translated as Green Serpent or Green Dragon) is a French fairy tale written by Marie Catherine d'Aulnoy, popular in its day and representative of European folklore, that was published in her book New Tales, or Fairies in Fashion (Contes Nouveaux ou Les Fées à la Mode), in 1698. The serpent is representative of a European dragon. His description is:  "he has green wings, a many-coloured body, ivory jaws, fiery eyes, and long, bristling hair."

The Green Dragon is really a handsome king placed under a spell for seven years by Magotine, a wicked fairy. In many ways the tale is based on the story of Eros and Psyche, to which the narration pays conscious homage when referring to the "discovery" of the Green Dragon.

Plot

Feast scene 
This story begins with a celebration feast for two twin princesses, who would later be named Laidronette and Bellotte. The King and Queen invite many fairies but forgot to invite Magotine, the older sister of Carabosse. Magotine was the oldest and most wicked fairy that existed.  When she found out about the party,  she was so furious for not being invited that she placed a spell on Laidronette that turns her into the ugliest woman in the world. The other fairies intercede and persuade Magotine to stop before she has cast a similar spell on Bellotte.

Tower scene
Years pass by. Laidronette grows up intelligent but lonely. She asks to live in a tower so that she does not have to see anyone. However one day she roams outside, and the Green Serpent sees her and begins to take an interest in her. She is terrified of the Green Serpent at first sight and flees from him, and accidentally gets swept out to sea. The Green Serpent appears swimming alongside her boat, but she refuses his help. She nearly dies in the ocean.

Faraway kingdom scene

When Laidronette gains consciousness she finds she has been saved and taken to be the guest of an unknown king in a far away kingdom. The Green Serpent's identity as the spell-bound king is revealed to the readers. However, Laidronnette is not taken to see the king and does not learn this secret. All she knows is that an unseen king is taking very good care of her. Then the serpent starts talking to her at night, and is such a good companion over the years she falls in love with his conversation, sight unseen, and they get married.

The Green Serpent king convinces his wife to wait until the end of the seven-year period, to see what he looks like, or else his wicked enchantment in the form of a dragon will start all over again. Laidronette compares her own marriage with that of Eros and Psyche in Greek mythology, and tries to resist being "like Psyche" by waiting patiently for seven years. However, like Psyche, she is convinced by her family to take one look at her husband. When Laidronette discovers he is the same Green Serpent she once was so afraid of, war breaks out in the kingdom, and Magotine ruins the kingdom.  The Green Serpent is sent into Hades while Laidronette is taken to become Magotine's prisoner and servant.

Tribulations and tests
The serpent sends a good fairy to assist Laidronette in very difficult trials that Magotine thinks up: to spin cobwebs into hair and the hair into fishnets, to climb a mountain wearing iron shoes and a millstone around the neck, to fill a pitcher full of holes. In one of Laidronette's errands as a servant, she finds the "waters of discernment" and when she drinks it, she becomes wiser, when she splashes it on her face, her ugliness vanishes and she regains her natural beauty.

Enchanted forest
The good fairy then sends Laidronette into an enchanted forest to hide for several years. Finally however when a period of time or imprisonment for the Green Serpent has come to an end, Laidronette returns to Magotine and Magotine tells her to go into Hades and get her the "water of life."  Laidronette goes.

Descent into Hades
The personification of  "Love" comes to assist Laidronette in going down into Hades and speaking to Proserpina, reminding her that is where her husband is held captive. Once she goes into Hades, "Love" restores the dragon back to his original human form. After Laidronette and her husband are united in Hades, "Love" brings the couple back to Magotine, and forces Magotine to break her spells, and then sends the couple back to Laidronette's homeland. In the end, a moral is given: Love is said to be stronger than Magotine.

Analysis

Parallels
German philologist Ludwig Friedländer listed Le Serpentin Vert (translated as "The Green Dragon") as part of the "Cupid and Psyche" cycle of stories (which later became known as "The Search for the Lost Husband"). Similarly, scholar Jacques Barchilon considers the tale a literary retelling by MMe. d'Aulnoy of the Apuleian story.

The inhuman husband tells Laidronette the story of Cupid and Psyche as a cautionary tale to convince her to wait until the right time to reveal himself. However, her relatives provoke her in breaking the taboo. According to Barbara Fass Leavy, the reference to the tale then fails to teach Laidronette, who "must experience" Psyche's journey to learn the lesson intended.

Tale type
According to scholar Jack Zipes, the tale of The Green Serpent is classified in the international system as Aarne–Thompson–Uther type ATU 425, "The Search for The Lost Husband", stories where a girl or a princess is betrothed to a monstrous bridegroom, a la Beauty and the Beast. More especifically, the tale is type 425B, "Son of the Witch", a category of tales wherein the heroine is forced to work for a witch on dangerous and impossible tasks.

In the Catalogue of French Folktales, French scholars Paul Delarue and Marie-Louise Thèneze classify the tale as type 425A (or French sous-type A), following 's classification: Cupid and Psyche is type 425A with the witch's tasks, whereas type 425B contains the motif of gifts to the heroine and the "buying three nights" episode.

Translations
The story is sometimes translated as The Green Dragon, after its main character.

French illustrator Edmund Dulac translated the tale as The Green Serpent in his book Fairy Tales of the Allied Nations.

Literary critic Roger Sale translated the tale as Green Snake.

The tale was also translated by professor A. S. Byatt as The Great Green Worm and included in compilation Wonder Tales: Six Stories of Enchantment, edited by Marina Warner.

Legacy
The tale was one of many from d'Aulnoy's pen to be adapted to the stage by James Planché, as part of his Fairy Extravaganza. He also translated the tale as Green-Serpent, and renamed it The Island of Jewels when he adapted the tale to the stage.

See also
Baemsillang (The Serpent Husband)
Amewakahiko soshi

References

External links
 The SurLaLune Fairy Tale Pages - The Green Serpent (a reprint from The Fairy Tales of Madame D'Aulnoy by Miss Annie Macdonell and Miss Lee, English translators. London: Lawrence and Bullen, 1892.)

Works by Madame d'Aulnoy
Works about dragons
ATU 400-459